The Federal Signal Model 2 is an omnidirectional outdoor warning siren produced by Federal Signal Corporation.

Siren information and history
The Model 2 features a 2 HP universal motor powering a single-tone 5-port chopper motor, which was also used on the Thunderbolt 1000, another siren once made by Federal Signal. It can produce 3 signals at 102 dBC:

Alert (Steady)
Attack (Wail)
Fast Attack (Fast Wail)

The Model 2 is 25.5 inches tall by 12 inches wide, and weighs 68 lbs. It can be roof-mounted or pole-mounted, at a recommended 35–40 feet. It is available in two power choices: Model 2-120, running on single-phase 120/125 VAC, or Model 2-240, running on single-phase 240/250 VAC. It can be operated automatically or remotely with an indoor/outdoor Federal RC2W controller.

It features a 100% sheet metal enclosure with polyester powder-coated paint. Protective mesh screens are mounted on the siren's three openings to keep out birds and debris.

The Model 2 was first introduced in 1907 making it the longest running siren in production and it's still being produced today! The first design of the Model 2 featured 3 louvers, 2 on top and 1 on the bottom. This design lasted until around 1955. The newer and current design has 1 louver on top and 2 on the bottom. The first 2s were referred to as the "Long Legs". They were called this because the mounting legs that bolted to the motor were rather tall, at roughly 9 or 10 inches tall. It is also worth noting the Long Legs lacked the intake cone and stator ring for stabilizing the housing that newer sirens feature. The long leg sirens were predominately single tone, yet some dual tones have shown up, such as the example in New Orleans, LA that is pictured. The long leg sirens also used 4 brushes as opposed to 2. The 4 brush setup and long legs were replaced with a short leg, two brush setup around 1953, with the version still currently produced today. Although these differences are quite noticeable, the basic formula for the Model 2 has remained constant since the first ones were built around 1907. Federal had also made a coded version of the Model 2. A small motor located at the base of the siren would oscillate a gear which would move a metal shaft leading to the stator. Located at the top of the shaft was a small gear and a strip of gear teeth connected to the stator. When ever the bottom gear oscillates back and forth, the shaft would rotate and cause the stator to open and close making a "coded" signal. It is unknown how long the coded Model 2 was produced for.

Model 2T
The Model 2T was an omnidirectional siren manufactured by Federal Signal from the 1960s to the 1980s, mainly to fulfill the civil defense requirement for dual-tone warning signals. It had exactly the same design as the Model 2, but instead of a single-toned, 5-port chopper, it featured a dual-toned, 4/5 port chopper which produced 100 dBC at 100 ft. The 2T also ran on 120 or 240 VAC. The Model 2 is still being made, while the 2T's production ended sometime in the 1980s, around the time the need for civil defense sirens ended.

See also
Federal Signal Corporation

References

1. http://www.federalsignal-indust.com/product/2-omni-directional-siren

2. http://www.civildefensemuseum.org/sirens/manuals/2-5-SD10-STH10-STL10-255A154F.pdf

1921 introductions
Sirens